DTDP-3-amino-3,6-dideoxy-alpha-D-glucopyranose N,N-dimethyltransferase (TylM1) is an enzyme with systematic name S-adenosyl-L-methionine:dTDP-3-amino-3,6-dideoxy-alpha-D-glucopyranose 3-N,N-dimethyltransferase. This enzyme catalyses the following chemical reaction

 2 S-adenosyl-L-methionine + dTDP-3-amino-3,6-dideoxy-alpha-D-glucopyranose  2 S-adenosyl-L-homocysteine + dTDP-3-dimethylamino-3,6-dideoxy-alpha-D-glucopyranose

The enzyme is involved in the biosynthesis of mycaminose.

References

External links 
 

EC 2.1.1